Kim Joo-young (born March 9, 1991), better known as Jooyoung, is a South Korean singer-songwriter. He debuted in 2010 has released several singles and two extended plays, From Me To You (2012) and Fountain (2018).

Career 
Prior to his debut under RealCollabo, Jooyoung and his schoolmate Shin Dong-woo (who later debuted as B1A4's CNU) created a J&D duo for 2009 Chinchin Youth Song Festival. They had a band named 갭골 (Gapgol), and Jooyoung's nickname was 갭주 (Gapjoo).

RealCollabo days (2010–2013) 
Jooyoung was first introduced to public through a cover of George Benson's Nothing's Gonna Change My Love for You uploaded on October 11, 2010, on RealCollabo's YouTube channel as RealCollabo's 2nd artist. A month later he released another cover of Jeremy Passion's Well Done. He finally debuted on December 7 with digital single "그대와 같아 (Same as You)".

On December 11, 2012, he released his first mini album "From Me to You" with self composed song "네게 난" as title track, which also marked his debut as songwriter.

RealCollabo held its 'RealCollabo Live' concert, 'Siaena & Jooyoung RealCollabo Live 001' on January 18, 2013, at Hongdae V Hall. After this, he started guesting at other singers' showcases and concerts.

Leaving Real Collabo (2013–2014) 
Jooyoung announced his departure from RealCollabo on April 4, 2013, via his personal Twitter. After leaving RealCollabo, he moved to Belikewater Records. He was featured on Lyn's song "High Heel", and guested on her showcase performing the song. On September 30, he released digital single "Popstar", produced by Jay Chong.

He made a guest appearance on one of his best friend, Kim Feel's showcase held at DiDimHall Hongdae on November 28. He guested again on Kim Feel's 1st 'Another Concert' at Jazz Story, Seoul the following year.

Together with Go Hyung-suk, he helped B1A4's CNU composing the latter's first solo song, "음악을 취해 (Drunk with Music)", released on January 13, 2014. On the same year, Jooyoung and CNU teamed up with Jooyoung's former label mate Cheeze composing "Drive", released on July 14.

Joining Starship (2014–now) 
On July 30, Starship announced Jooyoung as their new artist under Starship X label and released his cover of Jeff Bernat's Call You Mine. He also made appearance as Starship's team member in Mnet's Singer Game, and became a hot topic because of his performance and eye-contact strategy.

He collaborated with former label mate d.ear composing "Taxi on the phone" for Topp Dogg's Kidoh, released on September 26. His first release under Starship X is digital single "지워 (Erase)", which is a collaboration project with Sistar's Hyolyn featuring runner up of Show Me the Money season 3, Iron. Digital single "Erase" also contains a remake version of his debut song, "Same as You". He then participated in Starship Planet's 2014 winter song, Love is You.

Jooyoung joined 'Starship X Concert' in Busan on August 16, and 'Starship X All Night Concert' in Seoul on December 5, 2014 with label mates Mad Clown, Junggigo, Hyolyn, Soyou, and Nuboyz (Shownu, Wonho, and Jooheon of Monsta X, and #Gun). On April 4, 2015, along with Kim Feel, Mad Clown, and Hanhae he guested on 'Rolling Saypop Concert Vol.1 ELUPHANT Fly me to the moon'. On May 23, he performed on Greenplugged Seoul 2015. He also made a guest appearance on one of K.Will's 2015 Small Hall Concert.

Along with his label mates, Jooyoung appeared on Starship's first idol survival show No.Mercy as guest judge from episode 6 to episode 9. On episode 9, his team won the fourth debut mission and got to release the song "0 (YOUNG)".

Jooyoung released single "91" for free on June 14, 2015, in order to celebrate his mother's birthday. On August 27, he released his third single "3", a double title track digital single. He also took part on collaboration with his old label mates Ra.D, d.ear, and Brother Su, releasing "Draw You". It is a remake of d.ear's old song which is also the last release of RealCollabo.

As of November 26, 2015, Jooyoung enlisted in military service. Starship announced his enlistment the next month right after the release of "Love Line", surprising fans and public. He finished his basic training on December 24 and has started serving as public service officer.

In spite of him still serving in military, Jooyoung kept releasing songs he had recorded before leaving for army. He still took part on Starship Planet's 2015 winter song "사르르 (Softly)". On January 7, 2016, he released his first soundtrack "들리나요 (Can You Hear Me)" for SBS drama Remember: War of the Son. On February 14, 2016, Jooyoung along with K.Will, Junggigo, and Brother Su released special Valentine song, "요리좀해요 (Cook for Love)".

In early 2018, Jooyoung completed his mandatory military service and returned to Starship Entertainment. On March 2, 2018, Jooyoung released a mini-album by the title of Fountain as a surprise to announce he had completed his service. 

From April to May 2018, Jooyoung was a contestant on the Mnet show, Breakers. He progressed until the semi-finals where he was eliminated.

On September 4, 2018, Jooyoung released a double single which contained two songs, “N/A” and “Inn”.

On May 31, 2019, Jooyoung released a single, "Lost". On June 30, 2019, Jooyoung released a single "아름 (Pure Happiness)" which included 3 songs, "Wipe It Up", "Pure Happiness (아름) (Feat. George)" and "Samchong View (삼청 View) (Feat. pH-1)".

On December 17, 2021, Starship announced that Jooyoung was leaving the label, and he hasn't resurfaced since.

Discography

Extended plays

Singles

Soundtrack appearances

Works as songwriter

Music Videos

Filmography

TV variety shows

Awards

References

External links 
 Official Fancafe

1991 births
South Korean contemporary R&B singers
Living people
Starship Entertainment artists
South Korean hip hop singers
Starship X artists
21st-century South Korean  male singers